Out Of The Light Of The 13 Dark Night was the first official full-length album released in Germany by the Japanese horror punk band Balzac. It consists of re-recordings of previously released songs by the band and is considered by some as a European counterpart to the album Beyond The Darkness, as it served to properly introduce Balzac to Europe.

Track listing
"Thirteen"
"Into The Light of the 13 Dark Night"
"Nowhere #13"
"Tomorrow"
"Day The Earth Caught Fire"
"Wall"
"The Pain(is all around)"
"Yami-no-mukou-no-subete-wo"
"Out of the Blue II"
"In Your Face"
"The Silence of Crows"
"A Day in the Darkness"
"The End of Century"
"Violent Paradise"
"Monster II"
"Beware of Darkness"
"The Bleeding Light"

Credits
 Hirosuke - vocals
 Atsushi - Guitar, vocals, chorus
 Akio - bass guitar, chorus
 Takayuki - drums, chorus

External links
Official Balzac Japan site
Official Balzac USA site
Official Balzac Europe site

2003 albums
Balzac (band) albums